Madland is a surname. Notable people with the surname include:

Daniel Madland (born 1977), Kurdish singer and television host
Ernst Madland (1927–1984), Norwegian gymnast
Tove Elise Madland (born 1965), Norwegian politician